McDade may refer to:

People
Alex McDade, Scottish anti-fascist and poet
Aubrey McDade, American marine
Robert McDade, American army colonel
Joseph M. McDade (1931-2017), American politician
Lucinda A. McDade (born 1953), American botanist
Wayne McDade, New Zealand rugby player
The McDades, a Canadian music ensemble
Jeremiah McDade
Solon McDade

Fictional characters
Victor McDade, a fictional character in Still Game
 McDade, a fictional character in the 1978 film Avalanche

Places
McDade Expressway, Pennsylvania
McDade Park, Pennsylvania
McDade, Alabama, an unincorporated community
McDade, North Carolina, an unincorporated community, United States
McDade, Texas, an unincorporated community, United States
McDade Independent School District